Shuotheriidae is a small family of Jurassic mammals whose remains are found in China, England and possibly Russia. They have been proposed to be close relatives of Australosphenida, the group that contains living monotremes, together forming the clade Yinotheria. However, some studies suggest shuotheres are closer to therians than to monotremes. The Shuotheriidae have been proposed as the sister group of the Gondwanian clade Henosferida and the Monotremata, which are the monotremes.

References

Further reading
 Zofia Kielan-Jaworowska, Richard L. Cifelli, and Zhe-Xi Luo, Mammals from the Age of Dinosaurs: Origins, Evolution, and Structure (New York: Columbia University Press, 2004), 214–215.

Prehistoric mammal families
Middle Jurassic first appearances
Late Jurassic extinctions
Taxa named by Zhou Mingzhen
Taxa named by Tom Rich